The Hanteng X7  is a mid-size crossover utility vehicle (CUV) produced by the Chinese manufacturer Hanteng Autos since 2016.

Overview
The Hanteng X7 is Hanteng's first product. Two engines are available including a 1.5L turbo producing 150hp and 215nm of torque, and a 2.0L turbo producing 190hp and 250nm of torque. The 1.5L turbo is mated to a 5 speed manual gearbox, and the 2.0L turbo comes with a 6 speed DCT. The engines are sourced from Mitsubishi, manufactured in China by the Shenyang-Mitsubishi engine-making joint venture.

Hanteng X7S and Hanteng X7 PHEV
A sportier version dubbed the Hanteng X7S and a plug-in hybrid version called the Hanteng X7 PHEV was launched during the 2017 Guangzhou Auto Show. Both versions feature redesigned front bumpers to differ from the regular version.

References

External links

Official website

Hanteng X7
mid-size sport utility vehicles
Front-wheel-drive vehicles
2010s cars
Cars introduced in 2016
Cars of China